The Ulëz Hydroelectric Power Station is a hydroelectric Power Station located near Ulëz, Albania. It has 4 units which were commissioned in 1957. It is operated by Korporata Elektroenergjitike Shqiptare (KESH). Its reservoir is fed and drained by the river Mat.

See also 

 List of power stations in Albania

References

Hydroelectric power stations in Albania
Buildings and structures in Mat (municipality)